Tsimafei Aliaksandravich Dzeinichenka (born November 5, 1986 in Homel) is an amateur Belarusian Greco-Roman wrestler, who competed in the men's heavyweight category. He won a silver medal for his division at the 2010 European Wrestling Championships in Baku, Azerbaijan, and eventually defeated Armenia's Artur Aleksanyan for the gold at the 2011 European Wrestling Championships in Dortmund, Germany. He also captured a silver medal in the same division at the 2010 World Wrestling Championships in Moscow, Russia, losing out to Iran's Amir Aliakbari. Dzeinichenka is a member of the wrestling team for Dynamo Homel, and is coached and trained by Ihar Piatrenka.

Dzeinichenka represented Belarus at the 2012 Summer Olympics, where he competed in the men's 96 kg class. He defeated Egypt's Mohamed Abdelfatah and Estonia's Ardo Arusaar in the preliminary rounds, and eventually upset Albanian-born Bulgarian wrestler and heavy favorite Elis Guri in the quarterfinal match, receiving a total score of four points in two straight periods. He progressed to the semi-final round, where he was defeated by Russia's Rustam Totrov, who scored a total of four points in two straight periods, leaving Dzeinichenka without a single point. Because Totrov advanced further into the final match against Iran's Ghasem Rezaei, Dzeinichenka automatically qualified for the bronze medal match, but narrowly lost the medal to Sweden's Jimmy Lidberg, with a three-set technical score (2–0, 0–1, 1–4), and a classification point score of 1–3.

References

External links
NBC Olympics Profile
 

1986 births
Living people
Belarusian male sport wrestlers
Wrestlers at the 2012 Summer Olympics
Wrestlers at the 2016 Summer Olympics
Olympic wrestlers of Belarus
Sportspeople from Gomel
Wrestlers at the 2015 European Games
European Games competitors for Belarus
World Wrestling Championships medalists